On 18 March 1814 Elector Wilhelm I of Hesse-Kassel (or Hesse-Cassel) founded the Order of the Iron Helmet.

Maximilian Gritzner describes the model and the statutes of the order as "influenced by the example of the Iron Cross".

References

Maximilian Gritzner, Handbuch der Ritter- und Verdienstorden aller Kulturstaaten der Welt innerhalb des XIX. Jahrhunderts. Auf Grund amtlicher und anderer zuverlässiger Quellen zusammengestellt. (Leipzig, 1893)

Orders, decorations, and medals of Hesse
1814 establishments in Germany
1810s in the Electorate of Hesse
Establishments in the Electorate of Hesse
Awards established in 1814